Fernando & Sorocaba or Fernando e Sorocaba are a sertanejo duo from Brazil.

Members
Fernando, full name Fernando Zorzanello Bonifácio, sometimes known as Fernando Zor (born April 21, 1984, in Ji-Paraná, Brazil). Fernando began singing when he was living in Cuiabá, where he moved at the age of 15.
Sorocaba, stage name of Fernando Fakri de Assis (born September 15, 1980, in São Paulo, Brazil). Sorocaba began when he was studying agronomy, in Londrina. He earned the nickname Sorocaba because he was raised in the city of Sorocaba, a municipality in the state of São Paulo, Brazil.

Discography

Albums
Studio albums
2013: Homens e Anjos (Men & Angels)
2016: FS Studio Sessions Vol. 1
2016: FS Studio Sessions Vol. 2

Live albums
2006: Ao Vivo em Londrina
2008: Bala de Prata (Silver Bullet)
2009: Vendaval (Hurricane)
2010: Acústico (Unplugged)
2011: Bola de Cristal (Crystal Ball)
2012: Acústico na Ópera de Arame (Som Livre)
2014: Sinta Essa Experiência (Som Livre)
2015: Anjo de Cabelos Longos
2017: Sou do Interior
2018: O Chamado da Floresta
2019: Isso é Churrasco

EPs
2014: Sem Reação (FS Produções)

DVDs 
2006: Ao Vivo em Londrina
2008: Bala de Prata - Ao Vivo
2010: Acústico
2011: Bola de Cristal - Ao Vivo
2012: Acústico na Ópera de Arame
2014: Sinta Essa Experiência
2015: Anjo de Cabelos Longos
2017: Sou do Interior
2018: O Chamado da Floresta
2019: Isso é Churrasco

Singles

References

External links 
Official website

Sertanejo music groups
Brazilian musical duos
2007 establishments in Brazil
21st-century Brazilian male singers
21st-century Brazilian singers